Poma is the surname of:

 Antonio Poma (1910–1985), Italian Catholic cardinal and archbishop
 Irma Poma Canchumani (born 1969), Peruvian artist and environmental defender
 Narendra Poma (born 1959), Nepalese boxer
 Pothin Poma (born 1997), New Caledonian footballer
 Ricardo Poma (born 1946), Chief Executive Officer of the El Salvadoran conglomerate Grupo Poma
 Rodolphe Poma (1884–1954), also known as Rudolph Poma, Belgian Olympic rower
 Sebastiano Poma (born 1993), Italian professional baseball player
 Silvio Poma (1840–1932), Italian painter